Following a childhood spent in El Salvador and Central America, Danielle Pons-Föllmi arrived in France at the age of 17, where she began her medical studies.
She became a doctor in anesthesiology and applied her medical experience on three continents.
She is responsible for the intellectual and literary approach of the “Wisdoms of Humanity” project.

Biography 
1980: Ph.D. in medicine at the Necker-Enfants Malades Hospital, in Paris, specializing in public health and tropical medicine

1981-1984: Missions in Panama, India, then with Doctors without Borders in Cambodia and Laos.

1984: Married the photographer Olivier Föllmi. Danielle continued to practice medicine and specialized in anesthesiology and resuscitation.

1991-1992: Danielle & Olivier Föllmi set off to live in India for two years with the exiled Tibetan community who, in 1992, entrusted them with the adoption of two children who would then come to live with them in Haute-Savoie, France. Danielle worked on the organization of the basic health requirements of the refugee Tibetan population in northern India and participated in the setting up of a team consisting of Tibetan doctors at the Tibetan children village of Dharamsala in the foothills of the Himalayas.

1992: Danielle and Olivier created HOPE (Himalayan Organization for People & Education), an association set up to promote development of the Himalayan world and support Tibetan educational values.

1994: Health problems caused Danielle to give up medicine. She then dedicated herself to bringing up her children. Having acquired a love for different cultures from a very early age, she now turned towards the wisdoms of the leading traditions, in a multi-cultural and multi-disciplinary approach.

2002: Creation of the éditions Föllmi in Annecy and publication of “Himalaya bouddhiste” together with Matthieu Ricard.

2003-2009: Publication of the seven volumes making up the “Wisdoms of Humanity” collection. Danielle now devoted herself to the publishing house, the collection, and the “Wisdoms of Humanity” project.

Danielle and Olivier were awarded the Vermeille medal by the Société d'Encouragement au Progrès (Society for the Encouragement of Progress) who singles out “those people who, continuously and by dint of personal effort, through their actions and creative spirit, have achieved extraordinary things, with the desire to place them at the service of humanity in any way whatsoever”.

Bibliography 

Books of Danielle & Olivier Föllmi 

 1996 : Les Enfants de l'Espoir : l’histoire des enfants réfugiés du Tibet, calligraphies de Lhakpa Tséring Sharley, Paris, Ed. de La Martinière, 60 p.
 1999 : Les Bergers de l'hiver, Paris, Ed. de La Martinière, [128] p.-[20] p. de dépliant.
 2002 : Himalaya bouddhiste, avec Matthieu Ricard, Paris, Ed. de La Martinière, 423 p. ; réed. en petit format, Paris, Ed. de La Martinière, 2008.
 2003 : Offrandes, 365 pensées de maîtres bouddhistes, Paris, Ed. de La Martinière, [750] p.
 2004 : Sagesses, 365 pensées de maîtres de l'Inde, préface de Giuliano Boccali, introduction de Jean Sellier, Paris, Ed. de La Martinière, [752] p.
 2005 : Origines, 365 pensées de sages africains, préface de Doudou Diène, avec la collaboration de l'Institut fondamental d'Afrique noire (IFAN) de Dakar, Paris, Ed. de La Martinière, [752] p.
 2006  Révélations, 365 pensées d'Amérique latine, préface d'Edmond Mulet, Paris, Ed. de La Martinière, [752] p.
 2007  Eveils, 365 pensées de sages d'Asie, préface de Nan Huai chin, Paris, Ed. de La Martinière, [750] p.
 2008 : Souffles, 365 pensées de sages d'Orient, préface et collaboration du professeur Paolo Branca, calligraphies de Ismet Bozbey, Paris, Ed. de La Martinière, [768] p.
 2009 : Femmes d'Eternité, Paris, Ed. de La Martinière, [384] p.
 2009 : Espoirs, 365 clés de la pensée occidentale, préface d’Enzo Bianchi, Paris, Ed. de La Martinière, [768] p.

References

External links 

 

French anesthesiologists
20th-century French women writers
Living people
Year of birth missing (living people)
Women anesthesiologists
20th-century French physicians
21st-century French women writers
21st-century French physicians